The following lists the buildings constructed by Thomas Metcalfe, governor of Kentucky, including many that survive are listed on the U.S. National Register of Historic Places.
Thomas Metcalfe (1780–1855) (sometimes spelled "Metcalf") was one of the most prominent stonemasons and building contractors during the settlement period of Kentucky. Among his notable constructions are the Old Courthouse in Greensburg, Kentucky, which is the oldest courthouse west of the Allegheny Mountains, and the first Kentucky Governor's Mansion.

Metcalfe later entered politics, representing the Kentucky in both houses of the United States Congress. He was also elected the state's tenth governor, inhabiting the executive mansion he helped build. Throughout his political career, he retained the nickname "Stonehammer" Metcalfe, an allusion to his earlier trade of which he remained very proud.

Locations may be seen in map displayed by following link labelled "Map of all coordinates using OpenSourceMap" on the right side of this page.

In addition to the structures above, some structures locally attributed to Metcalfe may have been works of his half-brother, John Metcalf III.

References 

Architecture in Kentucky